The Seychelles frog (Sooglossus sechellensis) is a species of frog endemic to Mahé, Silhouette and Praslin islands in the Seychelles. Higher altitude sites are considered to be more climatically stable and more suitable. The species is present in Morne Seychellois National Park, Silhouette National Park and Praslin National Park.

The reproductive biology of this species is unusual. Eggs are laid on the ground and guarded until they hatch. The tadpoles are thereafter carried on one of their parent's backs.

The IUCN assessed the species as "Endangered" in 2013. Although it is locally common, it has a small area of occupancy (about 29 km2), a severely fragmented habitat and distribution, and a declining population, particularly at lower altitudes. It is threatened by habitat degradation due to fire and invasive species (the tree Cinnamomum verum and the yellow crazy ant, Anoplolepis gracilipes). In addition, climate change projections predict a steady shrinkage in its area of habitat due to declining rainfall.

Genetic analysis indicates that the three populations of this species are all distinct from each other and are possibly even separate species. It has been proposed that each of the three populations be considered evolutionary significant units for conservation purposes.

References

External links 
Monitoring and research into the amphibians and reptiles of Seychelles

Amphibians of Seychelles
Endemic fauna of Seychelles
Sooglossus
Amphibians described in 1896